Tarumirim is a municipality in east Minas Gerais state, Brazil. It is located in the Vale do Rio Doce region and its population was estimated at 14,302 inhabitants in 2020 (IBGE). It was first founded by the Cunha brothers in 1911 and was named Patrimonio Cunha and Then was considered a Municipality on January 31, 1938 and named Tarumirim an indigenous name that means "Little Sky". City Website:https://www.tarumirim.mg.gov.br/principal

Districts:

 Bananal de Baixo
 Bananal de Cima
 Beija-Flor
 Cafemirim
 Dom Carloto
 Pega Bem
 Santa Rita
 Sao Vicente
 Taruacu de Minas
 Vai Volta

References

Municipalities in Minas Gerais